{{Infobox college soccer team
|name = Louisville Cardinalsmen's soccer
| current = 2022 Louisville Cardinals men's soccer team
| logo = Louisville Cardinals wordmark.svg
| logo_size = 200
|university = University of Louisville
|conference = Atlantic Coast Conference
|conference_short = ACC
|founded = 
|division = 
|city = Louisville
|stateabb = KY
|state = Kentucky
|coach = John Michael Hayden
|tenure = 4th
|stadium = Lynn Stadium
|capacity = 5,300
|nickname = Cardinals
|pattern_la1= _redborder
|pattern_b1= _redwhiteverticalcentral
|pattern_ra1= _redborder
|pattern_sh1 = _redbottom
|leftarm1= ffffff
|body1= ffffff
|rightarm1= ffffff
|shorts1= ffffff
|socks1= ffffff
|pattern_la2= _blackborder
|pattern_b2= _blackcollar
|pattern_ra2=_blackborder
|pattern_sh2= _blackbottom
|leftarm2= cc0000
|body2=  cc0000
|rightarm2=cc0000 
|shorts2=cc0000 
|socks2=cc0000 
|NCAAchampion = 
|NCAArunnerup = 2010
|NCAAcollegecup = 2010
|NCAAeliteeight = 2010, 2011, 2012, 2016
|NCAAsweetsixteen = 2010, 2011, 2012, 2014, 2016, 2017, 2019
|NCAAtourneys = 2007, 2008, 2009, 2010, 2011, 2012, 2013, 2014, 2016, 2017, 2018, 2019, 2021, 2022
|conference_tournament = 2009, 2010, 2013, 2018
|conference_season = Big East2009, 2010, 2012

The American2013''
}}
The Louisville Cardinals men's soccer''' team represents the University of Louisville in all NCAA Division I men's college soccer competitions. The team presently competes in the Atlantic Coast Conference. The team currently plays in the soccer-specific Lynn Stadium on the campus.

Overview 
Nearly all of the Cardinals success has come in the last ten years of play under the helm of Ken Lolla. The Cardinals first qualified for the NCAA Division I Men's Soccer Championship in 2007, and have appeared in every NCAA Tournament since then except 2015. Their best run came in 2010, where the Cardinals lost in the 2010 College Cup Final to the Akron Zips, 1–0. Since then, the Cardinals have reached the quarterfinals of the tournament in 2011, 2012, and 2016.

On December 27, 2018, Louisville named assistant coach John Michael Hayden to replace Lolla, who resigned on December 11 after leading the team for 13 seasons. Hayden, a graduate of local Trinity High School (named Kentucky Gatorade Player of the Year) played 4 seasons at Indiana University (winning two NCAA Championships) and several seasons professionally before retiring. Hayden served as an assistant coach for the Cardinals for four years before being promoted to his first head coaching position.

Roster

Notable alumni

References

External links

 

 
Soccer clubs in Kentucky
1979 establishments in Kentucky
Association football clubs established in 1979